The 1968 Miami Hurricanes football team represented the University of Miami as an independent during the 1968 NCAA University Division football season. Led by fifth-year head coach Charlie Tate, the Hurricanes played their home games at the Miami Orange Bowl in Miami, Florida. Miami finished the season with a record of 5–5.

Schedule

Roster

Game summaries

LSU

at USC

at Penn State

References

Miami
Miami Hurricanes football seasons
Miami Hurricanes football